Nationality words link to articles with information on the nation's poetry or literature (for instance, Irish or France).

Events
 January 16 - Canadian Poetry Association founded.
 May - The term "New Formalism" is first used in the article "The Yuppie Poet" in e AWP Newsletter in an attack on the poetry movement. The term is adopted as the name of the movement by those in it.
 November 11 - A memorial to sixteen English poets of World War I is unveiled in Poets' Corner of Westminster Abbey.
 A memorial to Hugh MacDiarmid is unveiled near his home at Langholm, Scotland.
 Boulevard magazine founded at St. Louis University by Richard W. Burgin.
 Influential Chinese literary magazine Tamen ("They/Them") founded with Han Dong as chief editor, with close collaboration of other Chinese writers, including Ding Dang, Yu Jian, Xiaojun, Su Tong, Naigu and Xiaohai. Nine issues will be published between 1985–1988 and 1993-1995 and in 2002 Tamen will be revived as a webzine.

Works published in English
Listed by nation where the work was first published and again by the poet's native land, if different; substantially revised works listed separately:

Australia
 Robert Gray, Selected poems 1963-1983
 Chris Wallace-Crabbe, The Amorous Cannibal, Oxford: Oxford University Press
 W. Wilde, et al., editors, Oxford Companion to Australian Literature (scholarship)

Canada
 Roo Borson, The Transparence of November / Snow,  (with Kim Maltman) American-Canadian
 Matt Cohen, In Search of Leonardo
 Dorothy Livesay, Beyond War: The Poetry.
 Anne Michaels, The Weight of Oranges
 P. K. Page, The Glass Air: Selected Poems (an expanded edition published in 1991)
 Ajmer Rode, Blue Meditations, by a Punjabi poet living and published in Canada and writing in English; London, Ontario: Third Eye Publications, 
 Joe Rosenblatt, Poetry Hotel, Selected Poems (1963-1985). McClelland & Stewart.
 Duncan Campbell Scott.Powassan’s Drum: Selected Poems of Duncan Campbell Scott. Raymond Souster and Douglas Lochhead, eds. Ottawa: Tecumseh."
 Elizabeth Smart, In the Meantime
 Raymond Souster, Flight of the Roller-Coaster: Poems for Younger Readers. Ottawa: Oberon Press.
 Raymond Souster and James Deahl. Into This Dark Earth. Toronto: Unfinished Monument Press.

India, in English
 Kamala Das, The Anamalai Poems ( Poetry in English ) 
 Hari Mohan Prasad, Indian Poetry in English, New Delhi: Sterling Pub. Ltd.
 Ajmer Rode, Blue Meditations, by a Punjabi poet living and published in Canada and writing in English; Blue Meditations, London, Ontario: Third Eye Publications,

Ireland
 Paul Durcan:
 The Selected Paul Durcan, second edition, including "The Hat Factory", "Tullynoe: Tete-a-Tete in the Parish Priest's Parlour"
 The Berlin Wall Cafe, including "the Haulier's Wife Meets Jesus on the Road Near Moone", and "Around the Corner from Francis Bacon"; Belfast: Blackstaff Press, Northern Ireland poet published in the United Kingdom
 John Ennis, The Burren Days, Oldcastle: The Gallery Press, 
 Seamus Heaney: From the Republic of Conscience, Amnesty International, Northern Ireland native at this time living in the United States
 Thomas Kinsella, Songs of the Psyche, Irish poet published in the United Kingdom
 Michael Longley, Poems 1963–1983, Northern Ireland poet published in the United Kingdom
 Richard Murphy, The Price of Stone, including "Morning Call"

New Zealand
 Ursula Bethell, Collected Poems, edited and with a substantial introduction by Vincent O'Sullivan, Auckland: Oxford University Press (posthumous)
 Alistair Campbell, Soul Traps, Pukerua Bay: Te Kotare Press
 Janet Charman, Marina Bachmann and Sue Fitchett, Drawing Together, New Women's Press
 Bob Orr, Red Trees
 Kendrick Smithyman, Stories About Wooden Keyboards, winner of the New Zealand Book Award for Poetry
 Ian Wedde and Harvey McQueen, editors, Penguin Book of New Zealand Verse, anthology, revised edition

United Kingdom
 James Berry (poet), Chain of Days
 Carol Ann Duffy, Standing Female Nude
 Douglas Dunn, Elegies
 Paul Durcan, The Berlin Wall Cafe, Belfast: Blackstaff Press, Northern Ireland poet published in the United Kingdom
 D. J. Enright, Instant Chronicles
 Roy Fuller:
 New and Collected Poems 1934–1984, see also Collected Poems 1962
 Subsequent to Summer
 Tony Harrison:
 Dramatic Verse, 1973-85
 The Fire Gap
 V
 Seamus Heaney: From the Republic of Conscience, Amnesty International, Northern Ireland native at this time living in the United States
 John Heath-Stubbs, The Immolation of Aleph
 Thomas Kinsella, Songs of the Psyche, Irish poet published in the United Kingdom
 Liz Lochhead, True Confessions and New Cliches
 Michael Longley, Poems 1963–1983, Northern Ireland poet published in the United Kingdom
 Norman MacCaig, Collected Poems
 Derek Mahon, Antarctica,, Gallery Press, Northern Ireland poet published in the United Kingdom
 Peter Reading, Ukulele Music
 Peter Redgrove, The Man Named East, and Other New Poems
 Jeremy Reed, New
 Carol Rumens, Direct Dialling
 Lisa St Aubin de Terán, The High Place
 Stephen Spender:
 Collected Poems 1928–1985
 The Journals of Stephen Spender, 1939–83 (biographical)
 R.S. Thomas, Ingrowing Thoughts
 Hugo Williams, Writing Home
 Benjamin Zephaniah, The Dread Affair

United States
 John Ashbery, April Galleons
 Paul Blackburn, The Collected Poems of Paul Blackburn
 Joseph Payne Brennan, Sixty Selected Poems (The New Establishment Press)
 Raymond Carver, Where Water Comes Together With Other Water
 Maxine Chernoff, New Faces of 1952 (Ithaca House)
 Amy Clampitt, What the Light was Like
 Michael S. Harper, Healing Song for the Inner Ear
 Robert Hayden, Collected Poems (posthumously published)
 Seamus Heaney: From the Republic of Conscience, Amnesty International, Northern Ireland native at this time living in the United States
 William Logan, Difficulty
 James Merrill, Late Settings
 Lorine Niedecker, From This Condensery and The Granite Pail (posthumous)
 Grace Paley, Leaning Forward
 Mary Jo Salter, Henry Purcell in Japan, Knopf
 Gjertrud Schnackenberg, The Lamplit Answer

Works published in other languages
Listed by nation where the work was first published and again by the poet's native land, if different; substantially revised works listed separately:

Denmark
 Niels Frank, ÿjeblikket, the author's first book of poetry
 Klaus Høeck, Jævndøgn ("Equinox"), with Asger Schnack, publisher: Schønberg; Denmark
 Søren Ulrik Thomsen, Mit lys brænder. Omrids af en ny poetik ("My candle is burning. Outline of a new poetics"), criticism; Denmark

French language
 Claude Esteban, Le Nom et la Demeure, Flammarion; France
 Abdellatif Laabi, Discours sur la colline arabe. L'Harmattan, Paris, Moroccan author writing in and published in France
 Jean-Guy Pilon, Comme eau retenue: poèmes 1954-1977, Montréal: l'Hexagone; Canada

Hungary
 György Petri, Azt hiszik

India
Listed in alphabetical order by first name:
 Amarjit Chandan, Kavitavaan, Navyug, Delhi; Punjabi-language
 Bernardino Evaristo Mendes, also known as B. E. Mendes, Konkani Sahitik Nibondh; Konkani-language* Jaya Mehta, Akashman Tarao Chup Chhe; Gujarati-language
 Kedarnath Singh, Pratinidhi Kavitayen’, Delhi: Rajkamal Prakashan; Hindi-language
 Nilmani Phookan, Nrityarata Prithivi, Guwahati, Assam: Barua Book Agency Assamese-language
 Thangjam Ibopishak Singh, Norok Patal Prithivi ("This Earth is Hell"), Imphal: V.I. Publication; Meitei language

Poland
 Juliusz Erazm Bolek, Teksty
 Ewa Lipska, Przechowalnia ciemnosci, ("Storage for Darkness"); Warsaw: Przedswit / Warszawska Oficyna Poetow i Malarzy
 Adam Zagajewski, Jechac do Lwowa ("To Travel to Lviv"), illustrations by Józef Czapski; London: Aneks

Spain
 Matilde Camus, Cristales como enigmas ("Glasses as enigma")

Other languages
 Christoph Buchwald, general editor, and Ursula Krechel, guest editor, Luchterhand Jahrbuch der Lyrik 1985 ("Luchterhand Poetry Yearbook 1985"), publisher: Luchterhand Literaturverlag; anthology
 Haim Gouri, Mahbarot Elul ("Summer's End"), Israeli writing in Hebrew
 Natalio Hernández, Xochikoskatl (Collar de flores, "floral necklace"), Mexican poet writing in Nahuatl
 Nizar Qabbani, Syrian, Arabic-language poet:
 Love Does Not Stop at Red Lights
 Insane Poems

Awards and honors

Australia
 C. J. Dennis Prize for Poetry: Kevin Hart, Your Shadow; Rosemary Dobson, The Three Fates
 Kenneth Slessor Prize for Poetry, Kevin Hart, Your Shadow
 Mary Gilmore Prize: Doris Brett, The Truth about Unicorns

Canada
 Gerald Lampert Award: Paulette Jiles, Celestial Navigation
 1985 Governor General's Awards: Fred Wah, Waiting for Saskatchewan (English); André Roy, Action writing (French)
 Pat Lowther Award: Paulette Jiles, Celestial Navigation
 Prix Émile-Nelligan: Anne-Marie Alonzo, Bleus de mine

United Kingdom
 Cholmondeley Award: Dannie Abse, Peter Redgrove, Brian Taylor
 Eric Gregory Award: Graham Mort, Adam Thorpe, Pippa Little, James Harpur, Simon North, Julian May

United States
 Agnes Lynch Starrett Poetry Prize: Liz Rosenberg, The Fire Music
 American Academy of Arts and Letters Gold Medal in Poetry, Robert Penn Warren
 AML Award for poetry to Emma Lou Thayne
 Bernard F. Connors Prize for Poetry: James Schuyler, "A Few Days"
 Consultant in Poetry to the Library of Congress (later the post would be called "Poet Laureate Consultant in Poetry to the Library of Congress"): Gwendolyn Brooks appointed this year.
 Frost Medal: Robert Penn Warren
 Pulitzer Prize for Poetry: Carolyn Kizer: Yin
 Whiting Awards (inaugural year): Douglas Crase, Jorie Graham, Linda Gregg, James Schuyler
 Fellowship of the Academy of American Poets: Amy Clampitt and Maxine Kumin

Births
 September 28 – Helen Mort, English poet
 December 22 – Kae Tempest, English performance poet

Deaths
Birth years link to the corresponding "[year] in poetry" article:
 January 16 – Robert Fitzgerald, 74 (born 1910), American poet and translator from classical languages
 January 30 – F. R. Scott, 85 (born 1899), Canadian poet and constitutional expert
 February 22 – Salvador Espriu, 71 (born 1913), Spanish Catalan poet
 March 30 – J. V. Cunningham (born 1911), American poet, literary critic and teacher
 April 17 – Basil Bunting, 85 (born 1900), English poet
 May 12 – Josephine Miles, 73 (born 1911), American poet and literary critic
 May 25 – Robert Nathan, 91, of kidney failure, American novelist and poet
 August 14 – Alfred Hayes, 74, of meningitis, English-born American writer of the labor song "Joe Hill"
 August 19 – Yamazaki Hōdai 山崎方代 (born 1914), Japanese, Shōwa period tanka poet
 September 22 – D. J. Opperman, 70, South African Afrikaans poet
 October 26 – Kikuko Kawakami 川上 喜久子 (born 1904), Japanese, Shōwa period novelist, short-story writer and poet, a woman
 October 31 – Nikos Engonopoulos, 81, Greek poet
 November 25 – Geoffrey Grigson, 80, English poet
 December 2 – Philip Larkin, 63, of throat cancer, English poet
 December 7 – Robert Graves, 90 (born 1895), English-born writer and poet
 December 22 – Vailoppilli Sreedhara Menon (born 1911), Indian, Malayalam-language poet

See also

 Poetry
 List of years in poetry
 List of poetry awards

Notes

20th-century poetry
Poetry